The Jacques Plante Trophy is awarded annually to the best ice hockey goaltender in Switzerland as voted on by a jury consisting of the captains and the coaches of the teams in the Nationalliga A. The Jacques Plante Trophy was donated in 1986 by legendary Canadian goaltender Jacques Plante's widow Caroline R. Plante, who resides in the canton of Valais, Switzerland.

Jacques Plante Trophy Winners
 2019 Leonardo Genoni, SC Bern
 2018 Elvis Merzļikins, HC Lugano
 2017 Leonardo Genoni, SC Bern
 2016 Elvis Merzļikins, HC Lugano
 2015 Leonardo Genoni, SC Bern
 2014 Cristobal Huet, Lausanne HC
 2013 Reto Berra, EHC Biel
 2012 Reto Berra, EHC Biel
 2011 Leonardo Genoni, HC Davos
 2010 Tobias Stephan, Genève-Servette HC
 2009 Ronnie Rüeger, Kloten Flyers
 2008 Ari Sulander, ZSC Lions
 2007 Jonas Hiller, HC Davos
 2006 Daniel Manzato, EHC Basel
 2005 Jonas Hiller, HC Davos
 2004 Marco Bührer, SC Bern
 2003 Lars Weibel, HC Davos
 2002 Lars Weibel, HC Davos
 2001 Cristobal Huet, HC Lugano
 2000 Cristobal Huet, HC Lugano
 1999 Ari Sulander, ZSC Lions
 1998 Thomas Östlund, HC Fribourg-Gottéron
 1997 Renato Tosio, SC Bern
 1996 Reto Pavoni, EHC Kloten
 1995 Lars Weibel, HC Lugano
 1994 Dino Stecher, HC Fribourg-Gottéron
 1993 Reto Pavoni, EHC Kloten
 1992 Pauli Jaks, HC Ambri-Piotta
 1991 Renato Tosio, SC Bern
 1990 Renato Tosio, SC Bern
 1989 Renato Tosio, SC Bern
 1988 Reto Pavoni, EHC Kloten
 1987 Richard Bucher, HC Davos

References

Ice hockey goaltender awards
National League (ice hockey)
Ice hockey in Switzerland
Swiss awards
Awards established in 1986
1986 establishments in Switzerland